The men's Taijiquan / Taijijian all-round competition at the 2018 Asian Games in Jakarta, Indonesia was held from 21 August to 22 August at the JIExpo Kemayoran Hall B3.

Schedule
All times are Western Indonesia Time (UTC+07:00)

Results
Legend
DNS — Did not start

References

External links
Official website

Men's taijiquan